Supergarage  (stylized as superGARAGE) was a Canadian indie rock band formed in 1995 in Thorold. They released one EP and three full-length albums.

History
Supergarage took their name from an auto shop owned by Passero's father. Supergarage is based out of Toronto. In 1995, they released their 6-song EP Duct Tape, which had the radio hit "Post-Teen Crisis" . In 1997, they released their self-titled debut album on Iron Music/BMG.

Original guitarist Mike Palermo left the band in 1998 to start a music store, Mikes Music. Original drummer Roger Habel Jr. left the band in 2002 and started several successful cover bands such as Betty Ford Band and Stays in Vegas.

In early 2000, they released Demolition, which garnered them praise for their mock video hit "Cheryl". Other videos made for that album were "Five Year Rut" and "On a Summer Nite". The band toured extensively in 2001 in support of the album.

In 2002, they released Elvis Was Bigger Than the Beatles through Sextant Records. It was reissued in 2003 on EMI. Their single from this record was "Sugar", which did very well on Canadian radio.

Supergarage toured with the Headstones, Big Sugar, I Mother Earth, Barstool Prophets, Matthew Good, Soul Asylum, and Green Day. The band was known as one of the hardest working bands in Canada and as road warriors.

They also had a track in Petz: Dogz 2 called "Pop Pop Radio instrumental".

Members
Marco DiFelice - Vocals
Mike Palermo - Guitar
Adam Mott- Guitar for Demolition and Elvis Was Bigger Than the Beatles
Rob "Knuckles" Passero - Bass
Roger Habel Jr. - Drums
Michael "rosie" Rosenthal for Elvis Was Bigger Than the Beatles

Discography

EPs
1995 Duct Tape

Albums
1997 The Self-Titled Debut Album by superGARAGE.
2000 Demolition
2002 Elvis Was Bigger Than the Beatles

Other appearances
2005 Songs from Degrassi: The Next Generation
2006 Tokyopop Presents: D-Sides

References

External links
superGARAGE Facebook Public Group

profile on MapleMusic's website
lyrics on Genius website

Musical groups established in 1995
Musical groups from Toronto
Canadian indie rock groups
1996 establishments in Ontario